Anna Ayala (born December 22, 1965) is an American fraudster and convicted felon. She is most known for bringing a fraudulent tort lawsuit against a Wendy's restaurant in San Jose, California in 2005. Ayala’s claims cost the chain more than US $21 million in lost revenue. This led to a felony charge of attempted grand larceny against her, to which Ayala pleaded guilty in September 2005. She was sentenced to nine years in prison on January 18, 2006 and served four years. In 2013, she received another prison sentence for an unrelated incident regarding filing a false police report and felony firearm possession.

Wendy's lawsuit
On March 22, 2005, Ayala alleged that she had found a severed human finger in her chili and sued Wendy's, a fast-food restaurant chain. After an investigation by the Santa Clara County Medical Examiner's Office and the San Jose Police Department, it was determined that the finger did not come from a Wendy's employee, or from any employee at the facilities that provided ingredients for the chili. Though early reports suggested that the finger was "fully cooked," the Santa Clara County coroner's office initially concluded that the finger "was not consistent with an object that had been cooked in chili at 170 degrees for three hours."

The Las Vegas Metropolitan Police Department investigated Ayala's home in Las Vegas, Nevada but did not disclose details on their investigation. Rumors spread that Ayala had a dead aunt who might be related to the case, although Ayala denied that anyone had recently died. Ayala claimed that the police treated her and her family "like terrorists," acting against her violently, but neighbors downplayed the event. It was later discovered that she had previously filed numerous lawsuits against various retail establishments.

The Las Vegas Metropolitan Police Department arrested Ayala on April 21, 2005, taking her to the Clark County Detention Center. Ayala was charged with felony attempted grand larceny and grand theft. The grand theft charge was allegedly in connection with the fraudulent sale of a San Jose mobile home, between September 2002 and November 2003, that Ayala did not own; in reality, it was owned by her live-in boyfriend, according to a statement filed by San Jose Police Detective Albert Morales. The attempted grand larceny charge was connected to the Wendy's chili finger case; a penalty enhancement was issued for inflicting more than $2.5 million in losses on Wendy's as a result of plummeting sales.

Prosecutors portrayed Ayala as a scam artist with a penchant for filing lawsuits. According to court records, tests indicated that the finger had not been cooked in the chili. They did not indicate where they believed the finger came from.

At a press conference held in San Jose, on April 22, 2005, local Wendy's franchise holder Joseph Desmond urged people to "please come back to Wendy's because we do serve wonderful hamburgers, shakes and everything else." Wendy's announced that, on that weekend, it would offer free Frosty shakes to all Bay Area customers as a show of goodwill and commitment in the wake of its investigation. Wendy's later expanded its offer of free Frosties nationwide.

On May 13, 2005, police announced that they had identified the finger as belonging to Brian Paul Rossiter, an associate of Ayala's husband. Rossiter had lost his finger in an industrial accident at an asphalt company in December 2004 and had subsequently sold the finger to Ayala's husband in order to settle a debt. Police received the information from an undisclosed caller to the Wendy's hotline, later discovered to be Rossiter himself.

On September 9, 2005, in San Jose, Ayala and her husband, Jaime Plascencia, pleaded guilty to conspiring to file a false claim and attempted grand theft. Ayala was subsequently banned for life from all Wendy's locations.

On January 18, 2006, Ayala was sentenced to nine years in state prison. Her husband, who supplied the finger, was sentenced to 12 years, 4 months in prison.

In her appeal to reduce her sentence, the Sixth District Court of Appeal agreed with her, saying that Judge Edward Davila's decision to impose five years for "aggravating circumstances" was based on his own fact-finding and not on a jury's conclusions.

Other cases
According to the New York Times, Ayala has a history of lawsuits, filing at least 13 different civil actions in California and Nevada which involved her or her children, some of which involved out-of-court cash settlements. In 1998, Ayala brought a lawsuit against San Jose-based La Oferta Review Newspaper for sexual harassment. The case was dropped.

In 2004, she lost a suit against a San Jose car dealership, General Motors Corp. and Goodyear Tire and Rubber Company, claiming that a wheel fell off her car. The suit was dismissed "with prejudice" (meaning it cannot be refiled) after she fired her attorney and failed to attend court or submit paperwork.

In 2004, Ayala claimed she had won a suit against fast-food restaurant chain El Pollo Loco in which she was awarded $30,000 in damages for medical expenses after her daughter, Genesis, contracted salmonella poisoning after eating at one of their Las Vegas-area restaurants. In mid-April 2004, El Pollo Loco spokeswoman Julie Weeks disputed this, saying that the company reviewed her claim and paid her nothing.

In 2013, Ayala made international headlines again after being sentenced to two years in prison for being an accessory to a felony, filing a false police report and being a felon in possession of a firearm. In October 2012, her son, Guadalupe Reyes, accidentally shot himself in the ankle. Reyes was not allowed to have the gun because he was on parole. Ayala filed a false police report, telling officers that her son had been shot in the ankle by two men. According to police, Reyes eventually cracked during questioning and admitted that he had shot himself, leading to his and Ayala's arrests.

References

External links
 Chili finger incident category on Wikinews, a sister project of Wikipedia, with 15 articles on the false claim

Living people
American fraudsters
Criminals from Nevada
Wendy's International
People from San Jose, California
1965 births